European route E 761 is a road part of the International E-road network. It begins in Bihać, Bosnia and Herzegovina and ends in Zaječar, Serbia.

Route 
 
 E71 Bihać
 E661 Jajce
 E661 Donji Vakuf
 E73, E661 Zenica
 E73, E762 Sarajevo
 Višegrad
 
 E763 Užice
 E763 Čačak
 Kraljevo
 Kruševac
 E75 Pojate
 E75 Paraćin
 E771 Zaječar

External links 
 UN Economic Commission for Europe: Overall Map of E-road Network (2007)
 International E-road network

International E-road network
Highways in Bosnia and Herzegovina
Roads in Serbia